Blinking with Fists is the debut book of poetry by The Smashing Pumpkins and former Zwan frontman, Billy Corgan. The progress and writing of the poems was covered in Corgan's blogs. The Volume of 57 poems was published by Faber and Faber in 2004 and received mixed reviews. Dwight Garner (critic) of The New York Times wrote that "at its best, Blinking With Fists is vivid and angular and not much worse than many first books of poems that arrive with heady praise from the poetry world's burghers."  Entertainment Weekly gave the effort a "D," calling the poems "both pretentious and confoundingly esoteric." The book peaked at #24 on the New York Times Best Seller list.

The jacket of the book was designed by Charlotte Strick and the artwork and author photograph are by Yelena Yemchuk, who was involved with artwork for The Smashing Pumpkins. Interior design is by Gretchen Achilles.

References

External links
Four poems from Blinking with Fists  at alittlepoetry.com

2004 poetry books
American poetry collections
Faber and Faber books
Books by Billy Corgan